Ralph Osburn Amsden Jr. (January 1, 1917 – November 2, 1988) was an American professional basketball player. He played for the Sheboygan Red Skins in the National Basketball League and averaged 2.2 points per game.

References

1917 births
1988 deaths
American men's basketball players
Basketball players from Chicago
Centers (basketball)
Marquette Golden Eagles men's basketball players
Sheboygan Red Skins players
Sportspeople from Pontiac, Michigan